West Berkshire is a local government district in Berkshire, England, administered from Newbury by West Berkshire Council.

History
The district of Newbury was formed on 1 April 1974, as a merger of the borough of Newbury, Bradfield Rural District, Hungerford Rural District and Newbury Rural District, along with part of Wantage Rural District.

Until 1 April 1998, Newbury District Council and Berkshire County council were responsible for the region at local government level. On 1 April 1998, Berkshire County Council was abolished and Newbury District Council changed its name to West Berkshire Council and took on the former County Council's responsibilities within its area.

Geography
West Berkshire is semi-rural in character, with most of the population living in the wooded Kennet valley. Apart from Newbury, the other main centres in the district include Thatcham, Hungerford, Pangbourne and Lambourn. Larger villages include Burghfield, Mortimer and Hermitage. 30% of the population resides in the East of the district, these towns and villages including Tilehurst, Theale, Purley-on-Thames and Calcot which form part of the Reading/Wokingham Urban Area. West Berkshire borders Hampshire to the south, Wiltshire to the west, Oxfordshire to the north and both the Reading and Wokingham authorities to the east. Around three-quarters of the land is designated North Wessex Downs Area of Outstanding Natural Beauty, ranging from the Berkshire Downs to the Thames Valley.

The highest point in southeast/south-central England is located in West Berkshire at Walbury Hill with a summit height of 297 m (974 ft) 2 km to the south of the village of Inkpen, though the hill is not particularly prominent.

West Berkshire has a number of water courses running through the area. In addition to the River Thames, there are the Rivers Lambourn, Kennet, Pang, Bourne and the Kennet and Avon Canal and a number of tributaries that feed these rivers. Properties within flood plains may be at risk of flooding from rising river waters or from water coming up through the ground in some periods of heavy and/or prolonged periods of rain. Purley and Pangbourne are particularly at risk.

Economy
West Berkshire has the 21st largest economy in England, characterised by low unemployment, above average wages, and abundance of jobs in technology and financial sectors. The presence of Vodafone has created a cluster of around 80 mobile phone related businesses in Newbury, while the Lambourn area is the second most important centre for the racehorse industry in Great Britain, employing over 800 people directly, and producing an annual income of £20 million.

West Berkshire is also home to Atomic Weapons Establishment, near Aldermaston, Wolseley plc, Bayer and PepsiCo.

Coat of arms
The coat of arms for West Berkshire was established in 1974 for Newbury District Council. Upon the creation of the unitary authority it was inherited by West Berkshire Council.

The colours of red and gold in the arms represent industry and the richness of the area, whilst the interwoven cross represents the weaving industry which was important to Newbury in past centuries. The corn on the shield represents the agriculture industry which is important to the area, whilst the cogwheels represent manufacturing and manufacturing achievement. The mural crown represents local government and the grassy mount symbolises the downs of the surrounding area. Finally, the horseman represents the two battles of Newbury in the English civil war.

Politics

Since 5 May 2005 the West Berkshire Council is Conservative-controlled because of a by-election in Thatcham North. Before that, the Liberal Democrats and Conservative Party had an equal number of seats but the Liberal Democrats had control due to the casting vote of the council chairman. The Liberal Democrats had first taken power in 1991.

The district is approximately coterminous with the parliamentary constituency of Newbury, except for areas to the east where parts of West Berkshire are incorporated into the constituencies of Wokingham and Reading West.

Education

There are 10 state-funded secondary schools operating in West Berkshire as well as numerous primary schools and a special school provision. There are also a number of private schools.

Further and higher education in the area is provided by Newbury College, however there are no universities, the nearest being the University of Reading and one of the University of West London campuses, both in the neighbouring Reading Borough.

Notable people
Richard Adams (1920–2016), author
Francis Baily (1774–1844), astronomer
Michael Bond (1926–2017), author and creator of Paddington Bear
David Cameron (born 1966), politician and UK Prime Minister
Terence Conran (born 1931), furniture designer
Emma Crosby (born 1977), television newsreader
Matthew Darby-Griffith (1772–1823), Napoleonic army general
Miles Dempsey (1896–1969), WW2 army general
James Hanson (1922–2004), industrialist
Max Hastings (born 1945), journalist
Nicky Henderson (born 1950), racehorse trainer
John Newport Langley (1852–1925), scientist
George Mann (1917–2001), English cricket team captain
Melinda Messenger (born 1971), model and TV presenter
Kate Middleton (born 1982), duchess and member of the British Royal Family
Julian Pettifer (born 1935), TV journalist
Chapman Pincher (1914–2012), journalist and author
Jenny Pitman (born 1946), racehorse trainer and author
Charles Portal, 1st Viscount Portal of Hungerford (1893–1971), WW2 air marshal
Chris Tarrant (born 1946), TV presenter
Jethro Tull (1674–1741), farmer and inventor
Alfred Waterhouse (1830–1905), architect
Theo Walcott (born 1989), footballer
John Winchcombe aka Jack O'Newbury (1489–1557), industrialist
Will Young (born 1979), pop singer

References

External links
 West Berkshire Government

 
Unitary authority districts of England
Districts of Berkshire
Berkshire, West